Flint Mine Hill Archeological District is an archaeological site and national historic district located at Coxsackie in Greene County, New York.

It was listed on the National Register of Historic Places in 1978.

References

Historic districts on the National Register of Historic Places in New York (state)
Archaeological sites on the National Register of Historic Places in New York (state)
Historic districts in Greene County, New York
National Register of Historic Places in Greene County, New York